The Love Bone Earth Affair is a home video by the American rock band Mother Love Bone. It was released in 1993.

Overview
The home video features never-before-seen footage of Mother Love Bone live in concert combined with previously unreleased interviews with frontman Andrew Wood, bassist Jeff Ament, and guitarist Stone Gossard. The documentary covers the band's formation and its eventual disbandment due to the death of Wood. Additionally, the videos for "Stardog Champion" and "Holy Roller" are included. The Love Bone Earth Affair was first released on VHS, with an official DVD version released on 4 November 2016 as part of the boxed set Mother Love Bone: On Earth as it is - The Complete Works.

Personnel
Mother Love Bone
Andrew Wood – lead vocals
Bruce Fairweather – lead guitar
Stone Gossard – rhythm guitar
Jeff Ament – bass
Greg Gilmore – drums

Production
James Bland, Lance Mercer – still photography
Adolfo Doring – Videoprofile
Troy Smith – direction
Josh Taft – direction on "Stardog Champion" video, Videoprofile
Tim Taylor – editor

Chart positions

References

External links

Mother Love Bone video albums
Rockumentaries